The 2022 Men's Ice Hockey World Championships was the 85th such event hosted by the International Ice Hockey Federation (IIHF). Teams were participating in several levels of competition. The competition also served as qualifications for division placements in the 2023 competition.

Due to the ongoing COVID-19 pandemic, only teams in the Championship division had participated in 2021, so the standard system of promotion and relegation between divisions and groups was not implemented; for 2022, each team remained at the level they had been assigned for the 2021 competition (due to the pandemic, this was actually a carry-over of the outcome of the 2019 competition). However, cascading promotions were made following the IIHF's suspension of Championship division teams Russia and Belarus due to the 2022 Russian invasion of Ukraine.

Championship (Top Division)

The tournament was played in Tampere and Helsinki, Finland from 13 to 29 May 2022.

Group A

Group B

Playoff round

Final standings

Division I

Group A
The tournament was played in Ljubljana, Slovenia, from 3 to 8 May 2022.

Group B
The tournament was played in Tychy, Poland, from 26 April to 1 May 2022.

Division II

Group A
The tournament was played in Zagreb, Croatia, from 25 to 30 April 2022.

Group B
The tournament was played in Reykjavík, Iceland, from 18 to 23 April 2022.

Division III

Group A
The tournament was played in Kockelscheuer, Luxembourg, from 3 to 8 April 2022.

Group B
The tournament was played in Cape Town, South Africa, from 13 to 18 March 2022.

Division IV

The tournament was played in Bishkek, Kyrgyzstan, from 3 to 8 March 2022.

References

External links
IIHF Official Website

 
World Ice Hockey Championships, Men's
IIHF Men's World Ice Hockey Championships